Mount Bryant is a mountain in the Fisher Range in the Rocky Mountains of Alberta. Named for Alfred Harold Bryant, a homesteader from the surrounding area who later became a forest ranger.

See also
Mountains of Alberta

References

Bryant
Alberta's Rockies